The third season of the reality television series Love & Hip Hop: Miami premiered on VH1 on January 6, 2020 until April 6, 2020. The show was primarily filmed in Miami, Florida and executive produced by Mona Scott-Young and Stephanie R. Gayle for Monami Entertainment and Dan Cesareo, Lucilla D'Agostino, Donna Edge Rachell, James Knox, Faith Gaskins and Brian Schornak for Big Fish Entertainment. Nina L. Diaz, Sitarah Pendelton, Lashan Browning and Phakiso Collins are executive producers for VH1.

The series chronicles the lives of several women and men in the Miami area, involved in hip hop music. It consists of 14 episodes, including a two-part reunion special hosted by Claudia Jordan.

Production
On November 15, 2019, Jojo Zarur announced on social media that the show would return on January 6, 2020. On December 9, 2019, VH1 confirmed the season's premiere date, along with a promo featuring rappers Sukihana, Brisco, Hood Brat and waist trainer entrepreneur PreMadonna, who had previously been attached to the show when it first started filming in 2016. On December 11, 2019, VH1 announced the return of Love & Hip Hop: Atlantas Joseline Hernandez to the franchise, who would join the cast alongside Shay Johnson's brother EmJay, rapper KaMillion and social media personality Saucy Santana, best known for his friendship with Yung Miami of City Girls. Santana made headlines during filming, after surviving a drive-by shooting outside a strip club. On December 30, 2019, VH1 released a six-minute super trailer.

Prince, Gunplay and Baby Blue Whoaaaa, Pleasure P and Spectacular of Pretty Ricky were included as cast members in the season's press release, however ultimately did not appear. 

Despite being credited as a main cast member for the entire season and heavily featured in its promotional material, Joseline disappeared from the show entirely after four episodes, after a series of interviews in which she criticised producer Mona Scott-Young.

Synopsis

Cast

Starring

 Trina (14 episodes)
 Trick Daddy (13 episodes)
 Amara La Negra (14 episodes)
 Shay Johnson (12 episodes)
 PreMadonna (12 episodes)
 Hood Brat (13 episodes)
 Bobby Lytes (10 episodes)
 Sukihana (14 episodes)
 Brisco (11 episodes)
 Joseline Hernandez (4 episodes)

Also starring

 Joy Young (14 episodes) 
 Jojo Zarur (6 episodes)
 Miami Tip (10 episodes) 
 Nikki Natural (8 episodes)
 Emjay Johnson (13 episodes)

Khaotic returns in a guest role, while rapper KaMillion and social media personality Saucy Santana appear as recurring guest stars throughout the season. The show features minor appearances from notable figures within the hip hop industry and Miami's social scene, including Amara's mother Mami Ana, Amara's manager Jullian Boothe, DJ Nasty 305 and Radio Big Mack of 99 Jamz, producer Balistic Beats and Hood Brat's boyfriend Kenny Nwankwo.

Episodes

Webisodes

Check Yourself
Love & Hip Hop Miami: Check Yourself, which features the cast's reactions to each episode, was released weekly with every episode on digital platforms.

Bonus scenes
Deleted and extended scenes from the season's episodes were released weekly as bonus content on VH1's official website.

References

External links

2020 American television seasons

Love & Hip Hop